The 2004 Singer Sri Lankan Airlines Rugby 7s was the sixth year of the Singer Sri Lankan Airlines Rugby 7s tournament. It also doubled as an Asian qualifier for the 2005 Rugby World Cup Sevens. Japan defeated Chinese Taipei 38 - 14 in the final of the Cup.

First round

Pool A

 45 - 7 
 19 - 14 
 31 - 14 

{| class="wikitable" style="text-align: center;"
|-
!width="200"|Teams
!width="40"|Pld
!width="40"|W
!width="40"|D
!width="40"|L
!width="40"|PF
!width="40"|PA
!width="40"|+/−
!width="40"|Pts
|-style="background:#ccffcc"
|align=left| 
|2||2||0||0||76||21||+55||6
|-style="background:#ccffcc"
|align=left| 
|2||1||0||1||26||59||-33||4
|-style="background:#fcc6bd"
|align=left| 
|2||0||0||2||28||50||-22||2
|}

Pool B

 26 - 10 
 26 - 10 
 33 - 05 

{| class="wikitable" style="text-align: center;"
|-
!width="200"|Teams
!width="40"|Pld
!width="40"|W
!width="40"|D
!width="40"|L
!width="40"|PF
!width="40"|PA
!width="40"|+/−
!width="40"|Pts
|-style="background:#ccffcc"
|align=left| 
|2||2||0||0||59||15||+44||6
|-style="background:#ccffcc"
|align=left| 
|2||1||0||1||36||36||0||4
|-style="background:#fcc6bd"
|align=left| 
|2||0||0||2||15||59||−44||2
|}

Pool C

 31 - 05 
 77 - 00 
 45 - 05 

{| class="wikitable" style="text-align: center;"
|-
!width="200"|Teams
!width="40"|Pld
!width="40"|W
!width="40"|D
!width="40"|L
!width="40"|PF
!width="40"|PA
!width="40"|+/−
!width="40"|Pts
|-style="background:#ccffcc"
|align=left| 
|2||2||0||0||76||10||+66||6
|-style="background:#ccffcc"
|align=left| 
|2||1||0||1||82||31||+51||4
|-style="background:#fcc6bd"
|align=left| 
|2||0||0||2||5||122||−117||3
|}

Pool D

 40 - 07 
 Arabian Gulf  31 - 00 
 28 - 14  Arabian Gulf

{| class="wikitable" style="text-align: center;"
|-
!width="200"|Teams
!width="40"|Pld
!width="40"|W
!width="40"|D
!width="40"|L
!width="40"|PF
!width="40"|PA
!width="40"|+/−
!width="40"|Pts
|-style="background:#ccffcc"
|align=left| 
|2||2||0||0||68||21||+47||6
|-style="background:#ccffcc"
|align=left|  Arabian Gulf
|2||1||0||1||45||28||+17||4
|-style="background:#fcc6bd"
|align=left| 
|2||0||0||2||7||||+9||2
|}

Second round

Bowl

Plate

Cup

References

2004
2004 rugby sevens competitions
2004 in Asian rugby union
rugby sevens